John Bayne is the name of the following individuals:

 John Bayne of Pitcairlie  (1620–1681), Scottish lawyer
 John Bayne (footballer) (1877–1915), Scottish footballer
 John Bayne (Presbyterian minister) (1806–1859), Scottish minister
 John H. Bayne (1804–1870), Maryland politician

See also 
 John Baine (disambiguation)
 John Baines (disambiguation)
 John Payne (disambiguation)
 John Wayne (disambiguation)